Paul E. Knapp is a major general in the Wisconsin Air National Guard. He is currently serving as the adjutant general of the Wisconsin National Guard.

Career
Maj. Gen. Knapp commissioned into the Air Force in 1992 as a graduate of the U.S. Air Force Academy. He started on active duty as a Special Agent for the Air Force Office of Special Investigations. He then attended navigator training at Randolph AFB, Texas, and Pensacola Naval Air Station, Florida. After completing training, Knapp served two operational tours as an F-15E Strike Eagle weapon systems officer and one as an air liaison officer to the U.S. Army in South Korea. In August 2003 Knapp separated from active duty and joined the 95th Airlift Squadron of the 440th Airlift Wing, General Mitchell Air Reserve Station, Milwaukee, Wisconsin, flying the C-130H Hercules. He maintained various positions there until 2008. In February 2019, Knapp became the Mobilization Assistant to the Commander of Air Force Nuclear Weapons Center at Kirtland Air Force Base, New Mexico. There he directed the Air Force's nuclear modernization, acquisition and sustainment programs with more than 1,300 personnel at 18 locations worldwide.

On March 5, 2020, Knapp was appointed Adjutant General of the Wisconsin National Guard by Governor Tony Evers. The position has a five-year term and a promotion to major general. Knapp took the command from Brig. Gen. Joane Mathews and Brig. Gen. Gary L. Ebben who both took turns serving as interim adjutants general since the dismissal of former state adjutant Maj. Gen. Donald P. Dunbar by Governor Evers. On November 18, 2020, Knapp was nominated for federal recognition and United States Senate confirmation of his promotion to major general. On December 14, 2020, his promotion was confirmed by voice vote of the full Senate.

Maj. Gen. Knapp has served as an Instructor, Evaluator, Flight Commander, Squadron Commander, Deputy Operations Group Commander and Vice Wing Commander. He has 681 combat hours, more than 262 combat sorties supporting operations Allied Force, Northern Watch, Southern Watch, Enduring Freedom, Iraqi Freedom and Joint Task Force Horn of Africa. Flying in 21 different aircraft, Knapp has over 3,000 flying hours.

Education
 Bachelor of Science, Political Science, Japanese minor, U.S. Air Force Academy
 Master of Science, Technology Management, University of Maryland, College Park
 Air War College

Personal life
Knapp is a native of Antigo, Wisconsin. He currently resides in Whitefish Bay, Wisconsin, with his wife, Dr. Renee Knapp and their two children.

Awards and badges

Dates of rank
Knapp commissioned into the Air Force in 1992. His current rank is Major General in the Wisconsin National Guard.

References

Living people
United States Air Force generals
Military personnel from Wisconsin
United States Air Force personnel of the Iraq War
Recipients of the Legion of Merit
Recipients of the Air Medal
Air Command and Staff College alumni
Air War College alumni
Wisconsin National Guard personnel
Year of birth missing (living people)
United States Air Force Academy alumni